This is a list of songs written by Norman Whitfield, either as a sole writer or with others

Chart hits and other notable songs written by Norman Whitfield

References

Lists of songs by songwriters
 
American rhythm and blues songs